The Georgetown Subdivision is a railroad line owned by CSX Transportation in the U.S. State of South Carolina. The line runs from Georgetown, South Carolina, to Andrews, South Carolina, for a total of 15.0 miles. At its north end the track continues south from the Andrews Subdivision and at its south end the track comes to an end.

See also
 List of CSX Transportation lines

References

CSX Transportation lines
Rail infrastructure in South Carolina